The 1940-41 Bohemian-Moravian Hockey League season was the second season of the Bohemian-Moravian Hockey League. Six teams participated in the league, and I. CLTK Prag won the championship.

Regular season

Promotion 
Semifinals:
 AC Stadion České Budějovice – SK Podolí Prag 2:0
 SK Meteor Svobodné Dvory – SK Židenice 1:0 n.V.

Final:
 AC Stadion České Budějovice – SK Meteor Svobodné Dvory 3:1 n.V.

AC Stadion Ceske Budejovice was promoted to the Bohemian-Moravian League for 1941–42.

External links
 Season on hockeyarchives.info

Bohemian-Moravian Hockey League seasons
Boh